Larry Jay Diamond (born October 2, 1951) is an American political sociologist and leading contemporary scholar in the field of democracy studies. Diamond is a senior fellow at the Freeman Spogli Institute for International Studies, which is Stanford University's main center for research on international issues. At the Institute Diamond served as the director of the Center on Democracy, Development, and the Rule of Law from 2009-2016. He was succeeded in that role by Francis Fukuyama and then Kathryn Stoner. 

Diamond has served as an advisor to numerous governmental and international organizations at various points in his life, including the United States Department of State, United Nations, World Bank, and U.S. Agency for International Development. He is a founding co-editor of the National Endowment for Democracy's Journal of Democracy, stepping down from that role in the autumn of 2022. He is also a coordinator of the Hoover Institution's Iran Democracy Project, along with Abbas Milani and Michael McFaul.

Education

Diamond obtained a B.A. degree in Political Organization and Behavior in 1974, an M.A. degree from the Food Research Institute in 1978, and a Ph.D. in Sociology in 1980, all at Stanford University.

Career 
Diamond was Assistant Professor of Sociology at Vanderbilt University (1980–1985). He was founding co-director of the National Endowment for Democracy's International Forum for Democratic Studies (1994–2009).

Among the many governmental and nongovernmental agencies that he has advised, Diamond served as a consultant to the U.S. Agency for International Development from 2002 to 2003.

Diamond was named Stanford's "Teacher of the Year" in May 2007. At the June 2007 commencement ceremonies he was awarded the Dinkelspiel Award for Distinctive Contributions to Undergraduate Education. Among the many reasons for Diamond to receive this award it was cited that he fostered dialogue between Jewish and Muslim students.

He was the dissertation adviser for Regina Ip, former Secretary for Security of Hong Kong during her years at Stanford.

In 2022, Diamond joined Yermak-McFaul Expert Group on Russian Sanctions as an expert to work on elaborating and imposing western sanctions against Russia which invaded Ukraine.

Post–2003 Iraq
In early 2004, Diamond was a senior adviser on governance to the Coalition Provisional Authority in Iraq.

His book Squandered Victory: The American Occupation and the Bungled Effort to Bring Democracy to Iraq, published in 2005, was one of the first public critical analyses of America's post-invasion of Iraq strategy.

Views on democracy 
Despite the surge of democracy throughout the world up until the 1990s, Diamond believes democracy must improve where it already exists before it can spread to other countries. He believes solving a country's governance, rather than its economy, is the answer. Every democratic country needs to be held responsible for good governance, not just when it suits them. Without significant improvements in governance, economic growth will not be sustainable. As Diamond stated in his book, The Spirit of Democracy: The Struggle to Build Free Societies Throughout the World, "for democratic structures to endure – and be worthy of endurance – they must listen to their citizens' voices, engage their participation, tolerate their protests, protect their freedoms, and respond to their needs."

Diamond has written and edited many pieces on the growth of democracy and its current recession on an international level. In his paper "The Democratic Rollback: The Resurgence of the Predatory State," Diamond states that one of the main reasons for this recession in democracy is a surge of young democratic countries which employ rigged elections, intense intimidation of any opposing political party, and unstoppable expansion in executive power. What makes it worse is that many of these countries are still being accepted as democracies by western states. He cites Vladimir Putin in Russia and Hugo Chávez in Venezuela as examples. Due to the growth of these corrupted semi-democracies, which Diamond calls electoral authoritarianism, there has been a worldwide fall in the confidence in democracy, especially in developing countries.

Unlike many other political scientists, Diamond doesn't hold economic development, or lack thereof, as the number one factor in the decline of democracy. Diamond states that the efficiency of the government is the first problem. If the government cannot provide a safe and equal economic and political playing field then any work in promoting economic development will be useless. He cites the Kenyan President Mwai Kibaki as an example. Kibaki helped Kenya reach some of its highest levels of economic growth but failed to address massive corruption, which led to claims of fraud in his 2007 presidential election, which in turn exploded into violence.

Diamond believes if governance is not improved in democratic states, people will turn to authoritarian alternatives. This will then lead to predatory states. Predatory states produce predatory societies: people do not gain wealth and a better quality of life through ways beneficial to the entire country, but get rich by taking advantage of power and privilege, by stealing from the state, and diminishing the power of the law. In order to ensure predatory states do not occur, institutions must be put in place to establish control and order.

So that democracy can be revived, and sustained, throughout the world, the U.S. and other developed countries must play their part. The U.S. should primarily give financial aid to countries that are using the money to further develop their governance. This selectivity is defined in the Millennium Challenge Account (part of Bush's foreign policy). Under this policy, it says a country will receive aid dependent on "whether they rule justly, whether they invest in basic health care and education, and whether they promote economic freedom." The important thing to remember is promoting democracy will take time and effort.

Books

As author 
 Ill Winds: Saving Democracy from Russian Rage, Chinese Ambition, and American Complacency, Penguin Press, 2019 
 In Search of Democracy, Routledge, 2016
 The Spirit of Democracy, Times Books, 2008
 Squandered Victory: The American Occupation and the Bungled Effort to Bring Democracy to Iraq, Owl Books, 2005, 
 Developing Democracy: Toward Consolidation, Johns Hopkins University Press, 1999
 Promoting Democracy in the 1990s, Carnegie Commission on Preventing Deadly Conflict, 1995
 Class, Ethnicity, and Democracy in Nigeria, Syracuse University Press, 1988

As editor 
 Political Culture and Democracy in Developing Countries
 
 Democracy in Decline?, with Marc F. Plattner
 Democratization and Authoritarianism in the Arab World, with Marc F. Plattner
 Will China Democratize?, with Andrew J. Nathan and Marc F. Plattner
 Democracy in East Asia: A New Century, with Yun-han Chu and Marc F. Plattner
 Liberation Technology: Social Media and the Struggle for Democracy, with Marc F. Plattner
 Politics and Culture in Contemporary Iran, with Abbas Milani
 Democracy in Developing Countries, four-volume series, with Juan J. Linz and Seymour Martin Lipset

Essays and articles

References

External links
 Larry Diamond Biography provided by Stanford University
 Larry Diamond papers, 1969-1977, at Stanford University
 "No Exit Strategy" – David Rieff reviews Diamond's book in The Nation magazine.
 

Interviews
 South China Morning Post podcast in which Larry Diamond shares his views on Hong Kong political reforms in a podcast interview with scmp.com reporter, James Moore, on September 19, 2006. Interview 3mins 43secs into podcast.

1951 births
Living people
Stanford University alumni
Stanford University faculty
Vanderbilt University faculty
Hoover Institution people
American political scientists
American sociologists
Place of birth missing (living people)
Carnegie Council for Ethics in International Affairs